
Gmina Żołynia is a rural gmina (administrative district) in Łańcut County, Subcarpathian Voivodeship, in south-eastern Poland.

Villages
Gmina Żołynia contains the villages and settlements of Brzóza Stadnicka, Gajówka, Kopanie Zmysłowskie, Kopanie Żołyńskie, Smolarzyny, Zagóra and Żołynia.

Neighbouring gminas
Gmina Żołynia is bordered by the gminas of Białobrzegi, Czarna, Grodzisko Dolne, Leżajsk and Rakszawa.

References

Polish official population figures 2006

Zolynia
Łańcut County